Eberhard Janotta (born 14 December 1961) is a German former footballer who played as a midfielder.

The midfield player appeared in 146 East German top-flight matches and scored 35 goals.

Janotta won one cap for the East Germany national team in 1986.

References

External links
 
 
 

1961 births
Living people
German footballers
East German footballers
East Germany international footballers
Association football midfielders
SV Babelsberg 03 players
SG Bergmann-Borsig players
2. Bundesliga players
DDR-Oberliga players